Gran Sport may refer to:
Buick Gran Sport, 1970s sports car
Maserati Gran Sport, 2000s sports car
Alfa Romeo Gran Sport Quattroruote, 1960s car